Elections were held in 2005 for both Senators and Deputies to the States of Jersey.

Senator Elections

The elections for Senator were held on 19 October 2005.  6 seats were available. At the Electoral Assembly held on 13 September 2005, 15 candidates were nominated for the 6 available seats: 
3 incumbent Senators seeking a further term
4 Deputies seeking a term on the Senatorial benches
8 other candidates.

Only one female candidate sought nomination. Two declared parties put forward candidates: the Jersey Democratic Alliance and the Centre Party.

Results
Candidate (Party) Votes 
Stuart Syvret (Independent) 15,131 
Ben Shenton (Independent) 14,025 
Freddie Cohen (Independent) 13,704
Terry Le Main (Independent) 12,159
Terry Le Sueur (Independent) 9,976 
Jim Perchard (Independent) 8,998 
Jerry Dorey (Independent) 6,693 
Roy Travert (Independent) 6,256 
Paul Le Claire  (Centre Party) 5,413 
Denise Carroll (Jersey Democratic Alliance) 5081 
Kevin Lewis (Centre Party) 5028 
Guy de Faye (Independent) 4,994 
Geoff Southern (Jersey Democratic Alliance) 4,724
Roger Bisson (Independent) 2,009 
Gino Risoli (Independent) 1,127 
Turnout 39.5%.

Deputy Elections
The election for Deputies was held on 23 November. Electoral assemblies were held in all parishes on 25 October. 52 candidates were nominated in contested elections for 23 seats.

St Helier Number One District

Paul Le Claire 644 
Judy Martin 628
Patrick Ryan 605
Jerry Dorey 598
Chris Whitworth 264
Turnout: 25.7%, Spoilt Papers: 5

St Helier Number two district
Shona Pitman 625 
Geoff Southern 547 
Alan Maclean 434 
Roy Travert 398 
Peter Pearce 288 
Peter Tabb 285 
Stephen Beddoe 220 
Robert Bisson 187 
Adrian Walsh 122 
Turnout: 29.27%, Spoilt Papers: 6

St Helier Number three and four district

Jacqui Hilton 1,417
Jacquie Huet 1,285 
Ben Fox 1,144 
Guy de Faye 836 
Denise Carroll 786 
Barry Shelton 685 
Darius J. Pearce 459 
Turnout:  27.1%, Spoilt Papers: 7

St Saviour Number one district

St Saviour Number two district

St Saviour Number three district
Roy Le Hérissier
Unopposed

St Brelade Number one district

St Brelade Number two district

St Clement

Grouville
Carolyn Labey
Unopposed

St John

St Lawrence

St Martin
Bob Hill
Unopposed

St Mary

St Ouen
James Reed
Unopposed

St Peter
Collin Egré
Unopposed

Trinity
Anne Pryke
Unopposed

Results
St. Lawrence - John Le Fondré; Deidre Mezbourian (2 seats)
St. Mary - Juliette Gallichan (1 seat)
St. John - Andrew Lewis (1 seat)
St. Brelade  (District No. 1) - Sarah Ferguson (1 seat)
St. Brelade  (District No. 2) - Sean Power; Peter Troy (2 seats)
St. Clement - Gerard Baudains; Ian Gorst (2 seats)
St. Saviour  (District No. 1) - Rob Duhamel; Celia Scott Warren (2 seats)
St. Saviour  (District No. 2) - Alan Breckon; Kevin Lewis (2 seats)

References

External links
channelonline.tv election page
BBC Jersey election page

General 2005
Jersey general election
General election